Yahidne may refer to several populated places in Ukraine.

 Yahidne, Chernihiv Oblast
 Yahidne, Donetsk Oblast